Betaflexiviridae is a family of viruses in the order Tymovirales. Plants and  fungi serve as natural hosts. There are 108 species in this family, assigned to 13 genera in two subfamilies. Diseases associated with this family include mosaic and ringspot symptoms.

Taxonomy
The following subfamilies and genera are recognized:
 Quinvirinae
 Carlavirus
 Foveavirus
 Robigovirus
 Plus three unassigned species:
 Banana mild mosaic virus
 Banana virus X
 Sugarcane striate mosaic-associated virus
 Trivirinae
 Capillovirus
 Chordovirus
 Citrivirus
 Divavirus
 Prunevirus
 Ravavirus
 Tepovirus
 Trichovirus
 Vitivirus
 Wamavirus

Structure
Viruses in Betaflexiviridae are non-enveloped, with flexuous and  Filamentous geometries. The diameter is approximately 12–13 nm. Genomes are linear, around 6.5–9kb in length. The genome codes for 2 to 6 proteins.

Life cycle
Viral replication is cytoplasmic, and is lysogenic. Entry into the host cell is achieved by penetration into the host cell. Replication follows the positive stranded RNA virus replication model. Positive stranded RNA virus transcription is the method of transcription. The virus exits the host cell by tripartite non-tubule guided viral movement, and  tubule-guided viral movement. Plants and  fungi serve as the natural host. The virus is transmitted via a vector (insects). Transmission routes are vector and mechanical.

References

External links

 Viralzone: Betaflexiviridae
 ICTV

 
Virus families